The Downing Street Christmas tree is the Christmas tree placed on Downing Street, outside 10 Downing Street, which is the official office and residence of the Prime Minister of the United Kingdom. It arrives near the end of November and is lit in early December for a live BBC News programme.

History
The tradition began in 1982 while Margaret Thatcher was in office. Members of the British Christmas Tree Growers Association take part in an annual competition for "growth of the year" and "champion festive wreath" and winners provide their trees and wreaths for display outside No.10 Downing Street. All entries are judged by fellow growers around two months before Christmas day in various categories. The winning tree must be 18 and a half feet tall (5.6 metres).

The tree is ceremonionally lit by the prime minister and his or her spouse, who usually say a few words first. The event is attended by various guests such as staff members, charity volunteers, British Armed Forces and their families, who sing Christmas carols afterward.

In 2012, David Cameron asked finalists from The X Factor to assist him in the lighting. In 2008, Prime Minister Gordon Brown's wife Sarah hit the lights with the help of Cub Scouts and Beaver Scouts.

Gallery

See also
 Trafalgar Square Christmas tree
 White House Christmas tree

References

External links
 Downing Street Official website
 The British Christmas Tree Growers Association homepage

Christmas in the United Kingdom
 
 
Annual events in the United Kingdom
Individual Christmas trees
Individual trees in England